Hugo James Hardy (16 October 1877 – 8 October 1936) was a German tennis player and jurist. He competed in the men's singles and doubles events at the 1904 Summer Olympics in St. Louis, where he was the only non-American competitor.

A lawyer, Hardy was on the board of an early version of the Deutschen Reichsausschuß für Olympische Spiele (DRA), a predecessor to the German Olympic Committee that oversaw sports in the Weimar Republic.

Hardy was born in Hamburg, the son of banker James Nathan Hardy and Helena Ida Noemie Cahn.

References

1877 births
1936 deaths
German male tennis players
Olympic tennis players of Germany
Tennis players at the 1904 Summer Olympics